Tommy Barkas, BEM (27 March 1912 – 1991) was an English professional footballer who played in England during the 1930s and 1940s.

Born in Gateshead, England, Barkas was one five brothers, including Ned, Harry, Jimmy and Sam, who all had professional careers. A cousin, Billy Felton, also played for England. He played in the Football League for Bradford City, Halifax Town, Rochdale, Stockport County and  Carlisle United, and he made almost 300 League appearances in total, including 171 for Halifax.

During the Second World War he joined the Royal Air Force and earned the British Empire Medal (Military) whilst serving in Malta. The official account of the events leading to the award  read "Corporal Barkas, along with Acting Flight Sergeant Hugh Shelly Stammuitz of Ozshott, dealt with numerous fires including those on a petrol bowser and an ammunition lorry while some 50 enemy aircraft were bombing the area".

He retired from football in 1949, having played 14 league games for Carlisle in the 1948-49 season.

References

Thwaites, Tony (1988). From Sandhall to the Shay - An Illustrated History of Halifax Town AFC 1911 - 1988

1912 births
1991 deaths
Association football inside forwards
English Football League players
Halifax Town A.F.C. players
Bradford City A.F.C. players
Rochdale A.F.C. players
Stockport County F.C. players
Carlisle United F.C. players
York City F.C. wartime guest players
Recipients of the British Empire Medal
Royal Air Force personnel of World War II
Royal Air Force airmen
English footballers
Barkas family
Military personnel from County Durham